Blood Covenant is an Indian heavy metal band, considered the pioneers of metal in South India from Chennai, formed in 2005.

History
The band was a major force in the death metal, thrash metal and christian metal genres in India starting from the late 1990s because of its vocalist Eddie's earlier bands like Bonesaw. Their later experiments are influenced by black metal. Currently the band's sound is a mix of Swedish death metal and Brazilian thrash metal forming into Blood Covenant's own thrash/death style. The band's current line up consists of vocalist Eddie Prithviraj, guitarist Ronald Nathanael, bassist Sibi Boycott Walter and drummer  Brijesh Sereno.

Blood Covenant has toured all major Indian cities doing live shows. Their most active years were from 2005 to 2009. Since 2010 the band has been involved in projects with French and Swedish metal artists to work on their upcoming album. The band's influences include Mortification, Living Sacrifice, Extol, Crimson Moonlight, Horde, Frost Like Ashes, and Antestor. All the lyrical content is based on the New Testament of the Bible.

Band members
Eddie (Ed Bull) Prithviraj - Vocals
Sibi Boycott (Thorn) Walter - Bass
Ronald (Slaughter) Nathanael - Guitars, Backing vocals
Brijesh (Hurricane) Sereno, - Drums

See also
Indian rock
Kryptos (band)
Bhayanak Maut
Nicotine (band)
Inner Sanctum (band)
Scribe (band)
Demonic Resurrection

References

Christian extreme metal groups
Indian heavy metal musical groups
Musical groups established in 2005
Musical quartets
Unblack metal musical groups
Thrash metal musical groups